The Whittier Line was a Pacific Electric interurban line which traveled between Los Angeles and Whittier via Huntington Park, Rivera, and Los Nietos. Due to its indirect route, the line was eventually replaced by bus service on Whittier Boulevard.

History
Construction of the route between Whittier and the Long Beach Line began in March 1902. The single track line opened to Whittier in November 1903. The route was graded wide enough to lay a second set of tracks in the future. Operations were undertaken by the Los Angeles Inter-Urban Electric Railway in 1904 and they had double tracked the line by September 1904. Southern Pacific assumed operation in 1908, and it was acquired by the new Southern Pacific in the 1911 Great Merger. By September 1935, the number of departures was reduced to one round trip daily and service to Walker was regarded a its own local line. The final train left Whittier on January 22, 1938 and Walker service ceased March 6.

Much of the route remains in service for freight trains. The line between Slauson and Los Nietos forms the Union Pacific La Habra Subdivision. The West Santa Ana Branch Transit Corridor light rail project is expected to use a section of the line between Slauson and the former Los Angeles and Salt Lake Railroad right of way.

Route
The Whittier Line followed the Long Beach Line from Los Angeles south to Slauson Junction (south of Slauson Boulevard) where it branched off in an easterly direction to Whittier and Yorba Linda. Fromthere, the double track Whittier Line ran easterly, in private way between dual roadways of Randolph Street, through Huntington Park, Vernon, Bell, and Maywood to reach the Los Angeles River. Crossing the [river, the double track in private way followed intermittent sections of Randolph Street through Bell Gardens and Commerce, and crossed the Rio Hondo south of Slauson Avenue.

The line continued easterly, south and parallel to, Slauson Avenue. Across the Pico Rivera area and the San Gabriel River into Los Nietos, where the line crossed the Atchison, Topeka and Santa Fe Railway Third District main line (Los Nietos) at Norwalk Boulevard then turned northerly towards Whittier. The single track La Habra–Fullerton–Yorba Linda Line branched easterly in private way off the Whittier Line east of Norwalk Boulevard. The line in private way followed Allport Avenue and Lynalan Avenue then turned easterly crossing Whittier Boulevard into Philadelphia Street to the PE station at Comstock Avenue.

Stations

References

Bibliography

 
 
 

Pacific Electric routes
Railway lines opened in 1903
Railway lines closed in 1938
Bell, California
Commerce, California
Huntington Park, California
Whittier, California
1903 establishments in California
1938 disestablishments in California
Closed railway lines in the United States